Cyclamen aldehyde is a fragrance molecule which has been used in soaps, detergents, lotions, and perfumes since the 1920s. It was granted generally recognized as safe (GRAS) status by Flavor and Extract Manufacturers Association (FEMA) in 1965 and is approved by the Food and Drug Administration for food use in the United States. The Council of Europe (1970) included cyclamen aldehyde in the list of admissible artificial flavoring substances, at a level of 1 ppm.

Synthesis 
Cyclamen aldehyde is not naturally occurring and is prepared by the crossed-aldol condensation of cuminaldehyde and propionaldehyde followed by hydrogenation in the presence of a catalyst.

References 

Aldehydes
Perfume ingredients